Yuliya Sergeyevna Pechonkina, née Nosova (born 21 April 1978 in Krasnoyarsk) is a Russian former athlete who specialized in the 400 metres hurdles and 4 × 400 metres relay. She was previously married to former sprinter Evgeny Pechonkin.

She held the world record in 400 m hurdles (52.34 seconds achieved on 8 August 2003 in Tula) for almost 16 years until it was broken by Dalilah Muhammad on 28 July 2019 and the rarely contested 4 × 200 metres relay indoor (1:32.41 with Yekaterina Kondratyeva, Irina Khabarova and Yuliya Gushchina).

She had a recurring problem with sinusitis, an illness which caused her to miss both the 2008 Beijing Olympics and the 2009 World Championships in Berlin. Given her ill health, she decided to retire from athletics soon after the World Championships and instead took a job in the banking sector.

She has an annual meet held in Yerino named after her, under the title Yuliya Pechonkina Prizes.

International competitions

National titles
Russian Athletics Championships
400 m hurdles: 2003, 2004, 2005
Russian Indoor Athletics Championships
400 m: 2002

Personal bests
400 metres - 53.22 s (2001)
400 metres hurdles - 52.34 s (2003)

See also
List of World Athletics Championships medalists (women)
List of European Athletics Indoor Championships medalists (women)
List of people from Krasnoyarsk
Russia at the World Athletics Championships
4 × 400 metres relay at the World Championships in Athletics

References

External links
 

1978 births
Living people
Sportspeople from Krasnoyarsk
Russian female hurdlers
Russian female sprinters
Olympic female hurdlers
Olympic athletes of Russia
Athletes (track and field) at the 2000 Summer Olympics
Athletes (track and field) at the 2004 Summer Olympics
Goodwill Games medalists in athletics
Competitors at the 2001 Goodwill Games
World Athletics Championships athletes for Russia
World Athletics Championships winners
World Athletics Championships medalists
World Athletics Indoor Championships winners
IAAF Continental Cup winners
European Athletics Indoor Championships winners
Russian Athletics Championships winners
World Athletics record holders
World Athletics indoor record holders (relay)